The Continental Navy xebec, Champion, commanded by Captain James Josiah, served in the Delaware River in a force composed of ships of the Continental and Pennsylvania State Navy during the American Revolution. It was this force that contested British efforts to establish sea communications with their forces in Philadelphia in the fall of 1777.

After several months of fighting against heavy odds, the American ships attempted to run past Philadelphia. The Pennsylvania State galleys succeeded but the Continental fleet, including Champion, was burned by its own officers on 21 November 1777, when tide and winds turned against them.

References

Ships of the Continental Navy
1777 ships
Maritime incidents in 1777
Xebecs